Warren Richard Spannaus (December 5, 1930 – November 27, 2017) was an American politician from the Democratic-Farmer-Labor Party (DFL) and the Attorney General of Minnesota from 1971 until 1983.  Spannaus graduated from the University of Minnesota Law School in 1963. He was elected attorney general in 1970 and assumed office on January 4, 1971. Spannaus was re-elected to the position twice, in 1974 and 1978, serving from 1971 to 1983. At the 1980 Democratic National Convention He won two votes for the presidential nomination In 1982, he ran for Governor of Minnesota as the DFL-endorsed candidate but lost the primary election to former DFL Governor Rudy Perpich, who went on to win the general election. Spannaus joined the Minneapolis-based law firm of Dorsey & Whitney. Spannaus married Marjorie Clarkson and had three children.

References

 Warren Spannaus profile, Our Campaigns.com

1930 births
2017 deaths
Minnesota Attorneys General
Minnesota Democrats
Candidates in the 1980 United States presidential election
20th-century American politicians
University of Minnesota Law School alumni
People from Saint Paul, Minnesota